William Wishart (1660–1729) was a Church of Scotland minister and the Principal of Edinburgh University from 1716 to 1728. He is not to be confused with his son William Wishart (secundus), who was subsequently the Principal of Edinburgh University from 1736 to 1754.

Life

He was born the son of Rev William Wishart (1621–1692), minister of Kinneil and his wife Christian Burne, Daughter of Richard Burne of Linlithgow. He was the grandson of Sir John Wishart (1570-1607) and Jean (Douglas) Wishart, the daughter of William Douglas, 9th Earl of Angus and his wife, Agnes Keith, daughter of William Keith, 3rd Earl Marischal. His brothers included Admiral Sir James Wishart and Sir George Wishart of Cliftonhall.

William was privately tutored, then studied divinity at Edinburgh University, graduating MA in 1680. He did further studies at the University of Utrecht and returned to Scotland in 1684. He was imprisoned as a Covenanter but released the following year. In January 1688 he was ordained as minister of a Presbyterian meeting house (known as the John Knox Church) on Sheriff Brae in Leith in place of Rev John Knox who had been banished to New Jersey as a slave on a plantation. In 1692 he received patronage to become minister of South Leith Parish Church. He was minister of South Leith for his first term as Moderator in 1706.

In September 1707 he was translated to be minister of the Tron Kirk on the Royal Mile in Edinburgh in place of the Very Rev William Crichton who retired due to age (77).

He was five times Moderator of the General Assembly of the Church of Scotland: 1706, 1713, 1718, 1724 and 1728.

Edinburgh University granted him an honorary Doctor of Divinity (DD) in 1728.

He died on 11 June 1729. His position at the Tron was filled by his son George. He is buried in the section of Greyfriars Kirkyard known as the "Covenanters Prison" (rarely open to public).

Publications

Theologia, or Discourses on God (1702)
A Discourse of Suppressing Vice (1702)

Family
He was married to Janet Murray (died 1744) daughter of Major William Murray of Touchadam, the son of Sir William Murray of Touchadam and Polmaise, and of Janet, daughter of Sir William Nisbet of Dean (1569-1639). Their children included Rev William Wishart who succeeded him as minister of the Tron Kirk and Rev George Wishart (1703–1785), Moderator of the General Assembly of the Church of Scotland in 1748.

He was probably the grandson of Rev William Wishart of South Leith who called for the execution of Marion Mure for witchcraft in 1632, the trial overseen by William Struthers of St Giles.

Notes

1660 births
1729 deaths
17th-century Ministers of the Church of Scotland
18th-century Ministers of the Church of Scotland
Alumni of the University of Edinburgh
Principals of the University of Edinburgh
Burials at Greyfriars Kirkyard